Tersane railway station is a railway station in Pendik, Istanbul, on the Marmaray line. Up until 2012, the station was a stop on the Haydarpaşa suburban commuter rail line. The original station consisted of two side platforms with two tracks. The station gets its name from the nearby Pendik Shipyards, as Tersane is Turkish for shipyard.

Tersane station was closed down on 1 February 2012, when all train traffic between Pendik and Arifiye was temporarily suspended due to construction of the Ankara-Istanbul high-speed railway. The station was demolished shortly after and a new station was built in its place. The new station consists of an island platform serving two tracks, with a third express track on the south side.

Tersane station was opened on March 12, 2019 along with the entire Marmaray line.

References

External links
TCDD Taşımacılık
Marmaray

Railway stations in Istanbul Province
Pendik
Marmaray